John Ernest Ekuban (23 February 1937 – 17 April 2021) was a Ghanaian politician and a member of the First Parliament of the Fourth Republic representing the Cape Coast Constituency in the Central region of Ghana.

Early life and education 
Ekuban was born on 23 February 1937 at Cape Coast in the Central region of Ghana. He attended the University of Cape Coast and obtained his Bachelor of Arts.

Politics 
He was first elected into Parliament on the ticket of the National democratic Congress for the Cape Coast Constituency in the Central Region of Ghana. He was defeated by S. Valis-Akyianu during the Parliamentary Primaries. Valis was defeated by Christine Churcher of the New Patriotic Party during the 1996 Ghanaian General Elections.

Personal life 
He was a Christian.

Career 
He was a teacher and a member of Parliament for the Cape Coast constituency in the Central region of Ghana.

References 

2021 deaths
1937 births
National Democratic Congress (Ghana) politicians
Ghanaian MPs 1993–1997
Ghanaian educators
University of Cape Coast alumni
Ghanaian Christians
People from Central Region (Ghana)